Wat Suthat Thepwararam is a Buddhist temple in Bangkok, Thailand. It is a royal temple of the first grade, one of ten such temples in Bangkok (23 in Thailand). Construction was begun by King Rama I in 1807. In the beginning, it was initially called "Wat Maha Sutthawat" (วัดมหาสุทธาวาส) and was located in the combretum grove. Further construction and decorations were carried out by King Rama II who helped carve the wooden doors, but the temple was not completed until the reign of King Rama III in 1847 or 1848. This temple contains the Buddha image Phra Sri Sakyamuni which have been moved from Sukhothai Province. At the lower terrace of the base, there are 28 Chinese pagodas which symbolize the 28 Buddhas born on this earth. Wat Suthat also contains Phra Buddha Trilokachet in the ubosot (ordination hall) and Phra Buddha Setthamuni in the Sala Kan Parian (meeting hall).

In 2005, the temple was submitted to UNESCO for consideration as a future World Heritage Site.

Preta of Wat Suthat

The temple dating back to the beginning of the Rattanakosin Kingdom, it was a place where stories about undead according to the beliefs of Buddhism and Siamese, preta (pret) are often depicted as a tall hungry ghost with a thin body and a scary howling cry. It was said that it often appears in front of the temple at night. Until it was said that "Pret Wat Suthat" in pair with "Raeng Wat Saket" ("vultures of Wat Saket").

However, it is believed that what people see as the preta of the Wat Suthat, probably comes from a misunderstanding about seeing the Sao Chingcha, or Giant Swing, a towering Hindu structure that stands in front of the temple at night with no more light.

Besides, one mural in the ordination hall of this temple, also shows painting of one preta lying to feed water from the monks.

Gallery

See also

List of Buddhist temples in Thailand
Devasathan Hindu temple nearby

References

External links

 A brief introduction

Suthat
Phra Nakhon district
Thai Theravada Buddhist temples and monasteries
Registered ancient monuments in Bangkok
19th-century Buddhist temples
Religious buildings and structures completed in 1847
Religious buildings and structures completed in 1848